A Crash Course in Roses is the fifth studio album by Catie Curtis, released on .

The album contains numerous love songs, with "Magnolia Street", a song about the realization that one is in love, gaining some radio airplay. While the album did not make the Billboard Music Charts, it was her most successful at that stage.

In addition to the love songs which make up the majority of the album, A Crash Course in Roses also bears two other songs: "What's the Matter", a criticism of her hometown of Saco, Maine for rejecting her when she came out as a lesbian, and "Roses", the story of a soldier conscripted into World War I.

Numerous other singer-songwriters appear in supporting roles on the album, including Mary Chapin Carpenter and Melissa Ferrick.

Track listing 
Source: Official site, Last.fm

Personnel 

 Catie Curtis – Vocals, producer, Wurlitzer, acoustic guitar, piano
 Michael Maxwell – gut string guitar
 Hugh McCracken – harmonica
 Sammy Merendino – tambourine, drum programming
 Catherine Russell – gut string guitar
 Ben Wisch – producer, engineer, mixing, Wurlitzer
 Tom "T-Bone" Wolk – accordion, sound effects, bass
 Jim Ryan – gut string guitar, mandolin
 Mark Spencer – electric guitar, slide guitar, National steel guitar, acoustic guitar
 Kenny White – gut string guitar, organ, piano
 Akira Satake – banjo
 Todd Reynolds – violin
 Dawn Buckholz – cello, string arrangements
 Liz Marshall – gut string guitar
 Duke Levine – electric guitar, mandola, omnichord, e-bow, acoustic guitar
 Manolo Badrena – conga, percussion
 Paul Bryan – djembe, shaker, bass pedals, organ, bass, percussion
 Mary Chapin Carpenter – gut string guitar
 Billy Conway – drums, snare drums, percussion
 Melissa Ferrick – gut string guitar
 Jennifer Kimball – gut string guitar
 Jim Robeson – engineer
 Jana Leon – photography
 Steven Jurgensmeyer – design
 Bruce MacFarlane – assistant engineer
 Crit Harmon – engineer
 Kevin Pickering – assistant engineer
 Ted Jensen – mastering

References 

1999 albums
Catie Curtis albums
Rykodisc albums